J. Scott Yaruss is a professor of communicative sciences and disorders at Michigan State University.

Yaruss was formerly an associate professor at University of Pittsburgh School of Health and Rehabilitation Sciences and co-director of Stuttering Center of Western Pennsylvania.

Yaruss's research focuses on identifying linguistic and motoric factors that influence the development of fluency and stuttering in children. It is aimed at improving the diagnosis and treatment of people who stutter through assessment of current clinical practices and documentation of treatment outcomes.

In December 2005, Yaruss was named a fellow by the American Speech-Language-Hearing Association (ASHA). ASHA awards fellow status to members who have made significant contributions of a national or international nature to their professions. The status of fellow is retained for life and is one of the highest honors awarded by ASHA.

Living people
American scientists
Michigan State University faculty
Year of birth missing (living people)